Danell LaShawn Stevens Sr. (born December 12, 1969), better known as D-Shot, is an American rapper from Vallejo, California.  D-Shot got his start as a member of the rap group the Click, which also included his siblings E-40 and Suga-T, as well as his cousin B-Legit. After E-40 formed his record label Sick Wid It Records, the Click released their debut album, Down and Dirty, after which each member released solo projects. D-Shot's debut album, The Shot Calla, was released in 1993 through Sick Wid It Records. In 1995, D-Shot formed his own label, Shot Records, where he released his second album, Six Figures, in 1997.

Discography

Studio albums

Collaboration albums
 Down and Dirty with the Click (1992)
 Game Related with the Click (1995)
 Money & Muscle with the Click (2001)

Compilation albums
D-Shot Presents – Boss Ballin': The Best In the Business (1995)
D-Shot Presents – Boss Ballin' 2: The Mob Bosses (1998)
D-Shot Presents – Boss Ballin' 3: Greatest Hits (2003)
D-Shot Presents – Boss Players Vol. 1 (2003)
D-Shot Presents – Bosses In the Booth (2004)
D-Shot Presents – Boss Ballin' 4: The Next Line of Hitters (2005)
The Best of D-Shot: Yesterday, Today & Tomorrow (2009)

References

External links
 D-Shot at Discogs

African-American male rappers
American male rappers
African-American record producers
American hip hop record producers
Jive Records artists
Living people
Musicians from Vallejo, California
Rappers from the San Francisco Bay Area
Gangsta rappers
21st-century American rappers
Record producers from California
21st-century American male musicians
1969 births
21st-century African-American musicians
20th-century African-American people